Boyukagha Meshadi oglu Mirzazade (February 21, 1921, Baku – November 3, 2007, Baku) was a prominent Azerbaijani artist, named People's Artist of the Azerbaijan SSR in 1967.

Biography
In 1939, Boyukagha Mirzazade graduated from Baku Technical School of the Arts, where Azim Azimzade was one of his teachers. In 1940, Mirzazade entered the Moscow Institute of Fine Arts, but could not complete his education there because of the beginning of the Great Patriotic War. Later, Mirzazade studied at Azerbaijan State University of Culture and Arts. After graduating, he worked at a technical school of arts as a teacher and an artist. Mirzazade was the head of a department at Azerbaijan State University of Culture and Arts, and a professor of Azerbaijan State Academy of Fine Arts.

Works of the artist are kept and exhibited in Azerbaijan State Museum of Art, Nizami Ganjavi National Museum of Azerbaijani Literature and Baku Museum of Modern Art. Mirzazade acquired a reputation as an excellent theatrical artist and he is the author of stage designs for 20 shows. Mirzazade was a laureate of the State Prize of Azerbaijan Republic. The works of the artist were repeatedly exhibited in the USSR and in other countries.

References

1921 births
Artists from Baku
2007 deaths
20th-century Azerbaijani painters
21st-century Azerbaijani painters
Honored Art Workers of the Azerbaijan SSR